was a town located in Mitsuishi District, Hidaka Subprefecture, Hokkaido, Japan.

As of 2004, the town had an estimated population of 4,950 and a density of 14.30 persons per km2. The total area was 346.23 km2.

On March 31, 2006, Mitsuishi was merged with the town of Shizunai (from Shizunai District) to create the new town of Shinhidaka (in the newly created Hidaka District).

Climate

References

Dissolved municipalities of Hokkaido
Shinhidaka, Hokkaido